Gaam may refer to:
 Gam, Rolpa, a village development committee, in Nepal
 Gaam, or Ingessana, an Eastern Sudanic language spoken by the Ingessana people.